Mouth Congress is a Canadian film, directed by Paul Bellini and Scott Thompson and released in 2021. Blending both documentary and fictional elements, the film is a portrait of Mouth Congress, the gay punk band Bellini and Thompson formed concurrently with their rise to fame as members of The Kids in the Hall, including historical footage of the band during their original period of activity, scenes from the leadup to a 2016 reunion performance at The Rivoli, and a fictional frame story in which their KITH colleague Kevin McDonald appears as the uncle of a young girl who dreams about the reunion show after he tells her the history of the band as a bedtime story.

The film had been scheduled to premiere at the Kingston Canadian Film Festival in 2020, but after the festival was cancelled due to the COVID-19 pandemic in Canada it instead had its premiere at the 2021 festival.

Concurrently with the film's release, Thompson and Bellini released a three-song single, their first-ever release as Mouth Congress, for the 2021 Record Store Day. They followed up in December with Waiting for Henry, a compilation of recordings from throughout their career.

References

External links

2021 films
2021 documentary films
2021 LGBT-related films
Canadian documentary films
Canadian LGBT-related films
Canadian musical films
Documentary films about LGBT topics
LGBT-related musical films
Documentary films about musical groups
Queercore groups
2020s English-language films
2020s Canadian films